Mantovani (1905–1980) was an Anglo-Italian conductor, composer and entertainer.

Mantovani may also refer to:
 Mantovani Orchestra, a popular British dance band
 Mantovani (surname)
 Mantovani (horse), a racehorse
 Mantovani (TV series)